Nathaniel Matthew Eugene Davis (born September 23, 1996) is an American football guard for the Chicago Bears of the National Football League (NFL). He played college football at Charlotte and was drafted by the Tennessee Titans in the third round of the 2019 NFL Draft.

Professional career

Tennessee Titans

Davis was drafted by the Tennessee Titans in the third round (82nd overall) of the 2019 NFL Draft. He signed a four-year $3,810,648 rookie contract on May 30, 2019 with a signing bonus of $931,114 and a 2019 cap hit of $727,779.

Davis was inactive for the first three games of the 2019 season and made his regular season debut in the Titans' Week 4 win against the Atlanta Falcons. He got his first start in Week 5 and ended the season playing in 13 games, starting the last 12. During the season, he blocked for Derrick Henry who finished leading the league in rushing yards. The Titans finished with a 9-7 record and qualified for the playoffs. He started in all three Titans playoff games at right guard, blocking for Henry as he ran for nearly 200 yards in each of the first two games before the Titans lost to the Kansas City Chiefs in the AFC Championship.

Davis was made the starting right guard for the 2020 season, and started all 16 games, blocking for Henry as he won his second rushing yards title and became the eighth player in NFL history to run for 2000 yards in a season. The Titans won the AFC South and finished with an 11-5 record. In the playoffs, Davis stated for the Titans during their wildcard round for against the Baltimore Ravens.

Davis returned as the starting right guard for the 2021 and 2022 seasons, starting 14 and 12 games, respectively.

Chicago Bears
On March 15, 2023, Davis signed a three-year, $30 million contract with the Chicago Bears.

Personal life
Nate Davis was born in York, Maine to his parents Ken and Natalie Davis. They later moved to Ashburn, Virginia where Nate grew up. Davis Attended Stone Bridge High School and was a first-team all-state and 5A North All-Region First-team lineman. Davis was a four-year letterman in high school.

References

External links
Charlotte 49ers bio
Tennessee Titans bio

1996 births
Living people
American football offensive guards
Charlotte 49ers football players
Chicago Bears players
People from Ashburn, Virginia
Players of American football from Virginia
Players of American football from Maine
Sportspeople from the Washington metropolitan area
Tennessee Titans players